The 2020–21 Premier League of Bosnia and Herzegovina, known as Liga 12 and also known as m:tel Premier League for sponsorship reasons, was the 21st season of the Premier League of Bosnia and Herzegovina, the highest football league of Bosnia and Herzegovina. The season began on 1 August 2020 and ended on 30 May 2021, with a winter break between mid-December 2020 and late February 2021.

There was no attendance from fans in the stadiums besides each team's staff and personnel due to the COVID-19 pandemic in Bosnia and Herzegovina.

Teams
A total of 12 teams contested in the league, including 10 sides from the 2019–20 season and two promoted from each of the second-level leagues, Krupa and Olimpik, replacing relegated sides, Čelik and Zvijezda 09.

Stadiums and locations

Personnel and kits

Note: Flags indicate national team as has been defined under FIFA eligibility rules. Players and Managers may hold more than one non-FIFA nationality.

League table

Positions by table
The table lists the positions of teams after each week of matches. In order to preserve chronological evolvements, any postponed matches are not included to the round at which they were originally scheduled, but added to the full round they were played immediately afterwards.

Results

Rounds 1–22

Rounds 23–33

Top goalscorers

References

External links

2020–21
Bosnia and Herzegovina
1